Annibale Castelli (1573 – 1623), was an Italian painter, active near his birthplace of Bologna.

Biography
He painted religious iconography in oil and fresco. Annibale was a pupil of Pietro Faccini. He painted the Resurrection of Lazarus for the church of San Paolo in Bologna. He painted a mannerist Madonna and Child with Saints (1603).

References

1570s births
1620s deaths
16th-century Italian painters
Italian male painters
17th-century Italian painters
Painters from Bologna
Italian Baroque painters